Raghukul Tilak is a former Governor of Rajasthan, an office he held from 1977 to 1981.

References

Governors of Rajasthan